Beatrix Kökény (born 12 March 1969) is a former Hungarian handball player, European champion and multiple Olympic medalist, who currently serves as the technical director of Ferencvárosi TC.

She is married to Géza Imre, an Olympic silver and bronze medalist épée fencer. The couple has two children, a son and a daughter, who are also handball players: Bence Imre (right wing) and Szofi Imre (goalkeeper).

Achievements
Nemzeti Bajnokság I:
Winner: 1989, 1990, 1991, 1994, 1995, 1996, 1997, 2000
Magyar Kupa:
Winner: 1992, 1993, 1994, 1995, 1996, 1997, 2001
EHF Cup Winners' Cup:
Finalist: 1994
Olympic Games:
Silver Medalist: 2000
Bronze Medalist: 1996
World Championship:
Silver Medalist: 1995
European Championship:
Winner: 2000
Bronze Medalist: 1998

Awards and recognition
 Hungarian Handballer of the Year: 1989, 1991, 1995
 Silver Cross of the Order of Merit of the Republic of Hungary: 1996
 Knight's Cross of the Order of Merit of the Republic of Hungary: 2000

References

1969 births
Living people
Handball players from Budapest
Hungarian female handball players
Olympic silver medalists for Hungary
Olympic bronze medalists for Hungary
Handball players at the 1996 Summer Olympics
Handball players at the 2000 Summer Olympics
Olympic medalists in handball
Knight's Crosses of the Order of Merit of the Republic of Hungary (civil)
Medalists at the 2000 Summer Olympics
Medalists at the 1996 Summer Olympics